"Falling In and Out" is a song by New Zealand group Mi-Sex, released in April 1981 as the lead single from their third studio album, Shanghaied! (1981). The song peaked at number 48 in New Zealand and 20 in Australia.

Track listings
Australia/New Zealand 7" (BA 222809)
 "Falling In and Out" 	
 "Round and Round"

Charts

References

Mi-Sex songs
1981 singles
1980 songs
CBS Records singles